Feng Jiren (11 August 1912 – 21 January 1996), known professionally as Fengzi (formerly romanized as Fung Tzu), also known as Feng Fengzi, was a Chinese actress, writer, literary editor, and dramatist. Her second husband was the American-born translator Sidney Shapiro.

In the 1940s, Fengzi did underground work for the Communist Party of China in Shanghai while also working as an actress (in leftist plays and films) and literary editor (for leftist magazines). She was almost arrested by the Nationalist government, but managed to escape to Beiping. In the Korean War, she briefly went to Korea with the People's Volunteer Army. During the Cultural Revolution, due to having worked with Jiang Qing in the 1930s (when Jiang Qing was an actress), Fengzi was severely persecuted and detained for 4 years. She was rehabilitated after the Cultural Revolution.

One of her short stories, "The Portrait", written in 1947, has been translated into English by Ann Huss.

Filmography

References

1912 births
1996 deaths
20th-century Chinese actresses
20th-century Chinese dramatists and playwrights
20th-century Chinese short story writers
20th-century Chinese women writers
Actresses from Wuhan
Chinese film actresses
Chinese women dramatists and playwrights
Chinese women short story writers
Fudan University alumni
Republic of China short story writers
Short story writers from Hubei
Victims of the Cultural Revolution
Writers from Wuhan